The 1987 African Cup of Champions Clubs was the 23rd edition of the annual international club football competition held in the CAF region (Africa), the African Cup of Champions Clubs. It determined that year's club champion of association football in Africa.

The tournament was played by 39 teams and was used a playoff scheme with home and away matches. Al Ahly SC from Egypt won that final, and became for the second time CAF club champion.

Preliminary round

|}
1

First round

|}
1 
2

Second round

|}

Quarter-finals

|}

Semi-finals

|}

Final

Champion

Top scorers

The top scorers from the 1987 African Cup of Champions Clubs are as follows:

References
Champions' Cup 1987 - rsssf.com

 
African Cup of Champions Clubs